Erica (heaths or heathers) is a large genus of flowering trees, shrubs, and subshrubs most diverse in southern Africa but found throughout the continent and in Europe. They have been introduced to Australia and North America. Erica is the type genus of the heath family, Ericaceae. , there are over 850 accepted species in Kew's Plants of the World Online.

A

B

C

D

E

F

G

H

I

J

K

L

M

N

O

P

Q

R

S

T

U

V

W

X

Z

Named hybrids
 Erica × darleyensis Bean – artificial hybrid
 Erica × flavisepala Guthrie & Bolus
 Erica × fontensis T.M.Salter
 Erica × nelsonii Fagúndez
 Erica × stuartii (Macfarl.) Mast.
 Erica × veitchii Bean
 Erica × vinacea L.Bolus
 Erica × watsonii Benth.
 Erica × williamsii Druce

References

L
Erica